La boîte noire, by Nic (Broca) & Cauvin, is the thirty-first album of the Spirou et Fantasio series, and the second of the authors. The story was initially serialised in Spirou magazine, before released as a hardcover album in 1983.

Story

In The Black Box, Fantasio opened the mysterious box that Jefferson, Boris and Karl left them (see La ceinture du grand froid), and discovers plans within for thousands of inventions. When he tests one in company of Spirou, it draws the attention of Commander Alexander, who retrieves the box with Kalloway. Spirou must exchange the black box with them for Fantasio's release.
Thanks to Jefferson, they discover that the gangsters are hiding in a stronghold in the Sahara, where they are protected by natives. Spirou and Fantasio travel there and succeed in taking the box back from Alexander and Kalloway, while making themselves pass for dead.

References

 Cauvin publications in Spirou and Nic Broca publications in Spirou BDoubliées

External links
Spirou official site album index 

Spirou et Fantasio albums
Works originally published in Spirou (magazine)
Literature first published in serial form
1983 books
1978 in comics
Comics set in Africa